Time metrology or time and frequency metrology is the application of metrology for time keeping, including frequency stability.
Its main tasks are the realization of the second as the SI unit of measurement for time and the establishment of time standards and frequency standards as well as their dissemination.

Time transfer

See also
Allan variance
Atomic clock
Chronometry
Clock drift
Coordinated Universal Time
Frequency drift
History of timekeeping devices
International Bureau of Weights and Measures
International Earth Rotation and Reference Systems Service
Time and Frequency Standards Laboratory
Time deviation

References

Further reading
 
 

Time
Frequency
Metrology